Birtley railway station served the town of Birtley, Tyne and Wear, England, from 1868 to 1955 on the East Coast Main Line.

History 
The station opened on 1 December 1868 by the North Eastern Railway.  It closed on 5 December 1955 to both passengers and freight traffic.

References

External links 

Disused railway stations in Tyne and Wear
Former North Eastern Railway (UK) stations
Railway stations in Great Britain opened in 1868
Railway stations in Great Britain closed in 1955
1868 establishments in England
1955 disestablishments in England